Mian Fayyaz (born 29 April 1959) is a Pakistani former cricketer. He played 64 first-class and 18 List A matches for several domestic teams in Pakistan between 1980 and 1993.

See also
 List of Pakistan Automobiles Corporation cricketers

References

External links
 

1959 births
Living people
Pakistani cricketers
Lahore cricketers
Multan cricketers
Pakistan Automobiles Corporation cricketers
Cricketers from Lahore